Gurak-e Mohammad Rahimi (also Romanized as Gūrak-e Moḩammad Raḩīmī; also known as Gūrak-e Moḩammadraḩīmī) is a village in Delvar Rural District, Delvar District, Tangestan County, Bushehr Province, Iran. At the 2006 census, its population was 249, in 63 families.

References 

Populated places in Tangestan County